Tarahuasi (possibly from Quechua tara (Caesalpinia spinosa), a small tree native to Peru, wasi house) is an archaeological site in Peru. It is located in the Cusco Region, Anta Province, Limatambo District.

References

External links 

Archaeological sites in Peru
Archaeological sites in Cusco Region